Paul Gockel (born 10 October 1965)  is an Australian Paralympic swimmer. He was born in Southport, Queensland.  He participated in four events in swimming at the 1992 Barcelona Games. He won a silver medal at the 1996 Atlanta Games in the Men's 4x100 m Freestyle S7–10 event and swam in three individual events.

References

External links
 

1965 births
Living people
Male Paralympic swimmers of Australia
Paralympic silver medalists for Australia
Paralympic medalists in swimming
Swimmers at the 1992 Summer Paralympics
Swimmers at the 1996 Summer Paralympics
Medalists at the 1996 Summer Paralympics
Australian male freestyle swimmers
S8-classified Paralympic swimmers
20th-century Australian people